Karambal is a village in Belgaum district in Karnataka, India.
Karambal village is located in Khanapur Tehsil of Belgaum district in Karnataka, India. As per 2009 stats, Karmbla is the gram panchayat of Karambal village.
Karambal has a total population of 1,400 people. There are about 294 houses in Karambal village.

References

Villages in Belagavi district